USS Naushon (SP-517) was a United States Navy patrol vessel in commission from 1918 to 1919.

Naushon was built in 1895 as the private steel-hulled steam yacht Oneonota by Delaware River Iron Ship Building and Engine Works at Chester, Pennsylvania. She later was renamed Norman and then Naushon.

On 31 August 1917, the U.S. Navy acquired Naushon from her owner, J. Shewan of Brooklyn, New York, for use as a section patrol vessel during World War I. She was commissioned as USS Naushon (SP-517) on 21 February 1918.

Assigned to the 7th Naval District, Naushon served on patrol duty along the United States Gulf Coast for the remainder of World War I.

Decommissioned after World War I, Naushon was stricken from the Naval Register on 13 June 1919. She was sold to Jose Frauquia & Company of Tampa, Florida, on 17 November 1920.

References

Department of the Navy Naval History and Heritage Command Online Library of Selected Images: U.S. Navy Ships: USS Naushon (SP-517), 1918-1920
NavSource Online: Section Patrol Craft Photo Archive: Naushon (SP 517)

Patrol vessels of the United States Navy
Ships built by the Delaware River Iron Ship Building and Engine Works
World War I patrol vessels of the United States
1895 ships
Individual yachts